Tony Rogers is the name of:

Tony Rogers (athlete) (born 1957), New Zealand middle-distance runner
Tony Rogers (director), Australian film director
Tony Rogers, keyboard player for UK band The Charlatans

See also
Anthony Rogers (disambiguation)